Tigertown Pictures is an album by British indie pop band Comet Gain. It followed a change of record label to Kill Rock Stars and introduced a new band line-up, with the exception of frontman/songwriter David Christian.

Critical reception
CMJ wrote: "Boy/girl lead vocals, astoundingly rough time changes and drunken yet still meaningful lyrics make this effort another interesting episode in this band's soap-operatic career." The Detroit Metro Times wrote: "With tear/beer-stained sentiments and boy-girl vocals, this U.K. gang of four’s art-punky rickety rack explores why our most cherished music turns on us when relationships fail."

Track listing

Personnel
David Christian - guitar

References

1999 albums
Comet Gain albums
Kill Rock Stars albums